The Roman Catholic Diocese of Rustenburg is a diocese located in the city of Rustenburg in the Ecclesiastical province of Pretoria in South Africa.

History
 June 28, 1971: Established as Apostolic Prefecture of Rustenburg from the Metropolitan Archdiocese of Pretoria
 November 18, 1987: Promoted as Diocese of Rustenburg

Special churches
 There is no Cathedral in the Diocese of Rustenburg.

Leadership
 Prefect Apostolic of Rustenburg (Roman rite)
 Fr. Henry Lancelot Paxton Hallett, C.SS.R. (1971.09.29 – 1987.11.18 see below)
 Bishops of Rustenburg (Roman rite)
 Bishop Henry Lancelot Paxton Hallett, C.SS.R. (see above 1987.11.18 – 1990.01.30)
 Bishop Kevin Dowling, C.SS.R. (1990.12.02 - 2020.11.25)
 Bishop Robert Mogapi Mphiwe (since 2020.11.25)

See also
Roman Catholicism in South Africa

Sources
 GCatholic.org
 Catholic Hierarchy

Rustenburg
Christian organizations established in 1971
Roman Catholic dioceses and prelatures established in the 20th century
Roman Catholic Ecclesiastical Province of Pretoria